Tarache is a genus of moths of the family Noctuidae erected by Jacob Hübner. It includes most former New World Acontia species. Lepidoptera and Some Other Life Forms and The Global Lepidoptera Names Index report this name as a synonym of Acontia.

Description
Palpi porrect (extending forward), frons with rounded corneous projection. Larva with four pairs of abdominal prolegs.

Species
Tarache aprica species group:
 Tarache aprica (Hübner, [1808])
 Tarache abdominalis (Grote, 1877)
 Tarache apela Druce, 1889
 Tarache ardoris Hübner [1831]
 Tarache assimilis (Grote, 1875)
 Tarache cratina (Druce, 1889)
 Tarache dacia (Druce, 1889)
 Tarache delecta (Walker, [1858])
 Tarache destricta Draudt, 1936
 Tarache flavipennis (Grote, 1873)
 Tarache isolata (Todd, 1960)
 Tarache knowltoni (McDunnough, 1940)
 Tarache lactipennis (Harvey, 1875)
 Tarache lagunae ((Mustelin & Leuschner, 2000))
 Tarache morides (Schaus, 1894) (syn: Tarache ochrochroa Druce, 1909)
 Tarache parana (E. D. Jones, 1921)
 Tarache phrygionis (Hampson, 1910)
 Tarache quadriplaga (Smith, 1900) (syn: Tarache alessandra (Smith, 1903))
 Tarache rufescens Hampson, 1910
 Tarache sutor (Hampson, 1910)
 Tarache tenuicula (Morrison, 1875)
 Tarache terminimaculata (Grote, 1873)
 Tarache tetragona (Walker, [1858])
Tarache bilimeki species group:
 Tarache acerba (H. Edwards, 1881) (syn: Tarache acerboides Poole, 1989)
 Tarache albifusa (Ferris & Lafontaine, 2009)
 Tarache areletta (Dyar, 1897)
 Tarache areli (Strecker, 1898)
 Tarache areloides (Barnes & McDunnough, 1912)
 Tarache arida (Smith, 1900)
 Tarache augustipennis Grote, 1875 (syn: Therasea flavicosta Smith, 1900)
 Tarache axendra Schaus, 1898
 Tarache bella (Barnes & Benjamin, 1922)
 Tarache bilimeki (Felder & Rogenhofer, 1874) (syn: Tarache disconnecta Smith, 1903)
 Tarache cora (Barnes & McDunnough, 1918)
 Tarache expolita (Grote, 1882)
 Tarache geminocula (Ferris & Lafontaine, 2009)
 Tarache huachuca Smith, 1903 (syn: Therasea orba Smith, 1903)
 Tarache idella (Barnes, 1905)
 Tarache lanceolata Grote, 1879
 Tarache major Smith, 1900
 Tarache mizteca Schaus, 1898
 Tarache phaenna (Druce, 1889)
 Tarache sedata H. Edwards, 1881
 Tarache toddi (Ferris & Lafontaine, 2009)
Tarache lucasi species group:
 Tarache lucasi Smith, 1900
 Tarache vittamargo (Dyar, 1912)

References

Acontiinae